Judy Amar is an American former thief, who committed 400–500 burglaries in the Boca Raton area of South Florida. Police detectives called her "The Bandit of Boca del Mar." She was profiled in the TV Series Masterminds in the episode "The Bandit Queen."

References

External links 
 Judy Amar at History Television
 Judy Amar at Court TV

Place of birth missing (living people)
1940s births
American people convicted of burglary
Criminals from Arkansas
Criminals from Florida
Living people
People from Miami